Kings of Deis Mumhain from the earliest times onward.

 Andelait mac Dimma Ua Oengusa?, fl. 697
 Torpaid mac Cernach mac Andelait, d. 765
 Cennetig mac Lorcan, d. 951
 Faelan mac Cormac, fl. 966
 Domnall mac Faelan, 966-996
 Mothla mac Domnall, 996-1014 - killed at Battle of Clontarf
 Diarmait mac Domnall, 1014–1031
 Muirchertach mac Broc, 1031–1051
 Mael Sechlainn mac Muirchertach Ua Bruicc, 1051–1059
 Mael Sechlainn mac Gilla Brigde Ua Faelan, 1059–1085
 Muirchertach Ua Bruicc, 1090–1103
 Maelsechlainn Ua Faelain, 1118
 Gerr na Ccuinneocc Ua Gruicc, 1128–1153
 Maelsechlainn Ua Faelan, 1153–1168
 Ua Faelan, 1168–1178
 Artcorb Ua Faelan, 1178–1203
 Domhnall Ua Faelan, 1203–1206
 Ross O Folan, described as "Chief of the Desi Mumhain", fl. 1244

External links
Kings of the Déisi

Medieval Ireland
Dál gCais
Lists of Irish monarchs